The Florida International University (FIU) College of Business, located in Miami, Florida in the United States is one of the university's 26 schools and colleges and was founded in 1965. The college is split into two separate schools: the Landon Undergraduate School of Business with over 7,00 students and the Chapman Graduate School of Business with close to 2,200 students, making the College of Business the most popular and largest professional college at FIU. The College of Business attracts top faculty and students and is consistently ranked highly by the Princeton Review, U.S. News & World Report, the Financial Times, and BusinessWeek.

The College of Business is among the 5 percent of elite business schools worldwide accredited by the AACSB International - The Association to Advance Collegiate Schools of Business.

Deans
1997 - 2012 - Joyce Elam

2012 - 2014 - David Klock

2015 - 2017 - Joanne Li

2021–Present - William G. Hardin III

Campuses 
The college is located in three different campuses or centers. In Miami at the Modesto Maidique Campus (MMC), there are three separate buildings, the Ryder Business Building (for the Landon Undergraduate School of Business), the College of Business Complex (for the Chapman Graduate School of Business), the Management And New Growth Opportunities (MANGO) building.

Classes, faculty, and staff are also located in Downtown Miami, formally known as FIU Downtown on Brickell. Some programs can also be completed in Miramar at FIU at I-75.

The Department of Marketing, the Department of Finance, the Department of Information Systems and Business Analytics (ISBA) are housed in the Ryder Business Building (RB), while the Department of International Business, Department of Global Leadership and Management, and the School of Accounting are located in MANGO. MANGO also houses the College's Undergraduate Academic Advising.

The College of Business Complex (CBC) houses the Dean's Office, the College's Graduate Admission and Recruitment Offices, the College's Human Resources, and the College's Career Management Services.

Undergraduate programs
The college offers undergraduate degrees in:

 Accounting (BACC)
 Business Analytics (BBA)
 Finance (BBA)
 Human Resource Management (BBA)
Ranked #1 by HR.com (2019).
 International Business (BBA)
Ranked #2 in Best Undergraduate International Business Program by U.S. News & World Report (2020).
 Information Systems (BBA)
 Logistics and Supply Chain Management (BBA)
 Management (BBA)
 Marketing (BBA)
 Real Estate (BBA)

Graduate programs
The College of Business offers numerous degree and non-degree options to those interested.

Degree-seeking programs

MBAs 
Programs designated with an * can be completed fully online.

 Full-time International MBA
Year-long program ranked #12 by U.S. News & World Report (2019). The program is completed at MMC in Miami.
 Healthcare MBA*
18-month program ranked #1 by Modern Healthcare (2015 and 2016). Also ranked #51 by U.S. News & World Report (2020).
The program can be completed at the Brickell, Miramar, or fully online.
Accredited by the Commission on Accreditation of Healthcare Management Education (CAHME).
 Professional MBA for Executives (Executive MBA)
 16-month program with a hybrid format consisting of both in-person classes at Brickell and online.
 Professional MBA*
Three formats: Weekend offered at the Miramar campus, Downtown offered at the Brickell campus, and Flex offered at the Brickell campus with an online-component.
Program is 16 months long for Weekend and Downtown, while the Flex program is 20 months long.
This fully online program can be completed in 18, 21, or 33 months. It has been ranked #18 best Online MBA program in the world by the Financial Times (2018).

Specialized Master's 
Programs designated with an * can be completed fully online.

 Master of Accounting
10-month program in partnership with ACCA, the Association for Certified Chartered Accountants. Upon graduation, accounting students will be automatically deemed to have fulfilled eight sections of the Association of Chartered Certified Accountants exam, a designation similar to the Certified Public Accountant (CPA).
Specialized tracks include: Taxation, Assurance, and Analytics.
Accredited by the Federation of Schools of Accountancy (FSA).
 Master of International Business*
12-month program completed at MMC in Miami or fully online.
 Master of Science in Finance
Ranked #6 by the Financial Times.
 Specialized tracks include: Financial Management, Investments, and International Banking & Financial Institutions.
Part of the University Affiliation Program with the CFA Institute.
Campuses include: MMC, Miramar, or Brickell.
Program is completed in 12 months.
Master of Science in Health Informatics & Analytics*
Can be completed in 14 months, fully online only.
Accredited by The Commission on Accreditation for Health Informatics and Information Management Education (CAHIIM)
 Master of Science in Human Resource Management*
Ranked #1 Best M.S. in HR by HR.com (2019).
Completed at MMC, Miramar., or fully online.
Master of Science in Information Systems
Includes three specialized tracks: Business Analytics (14-months), Cybersecurity (14-months), and an accelerated 12-month track.
Can be completed at MMC.
 Master of Science in International Real Estate*
The Hollo School of Real Estate was ranked #1 in the U.S. and #2 globally by the Journal of Real Estate Literature for contributions by the College of Business faculty in real estate research.
The program is completed at the Brickell campus or fully online.
 Master of Science in Logistics and Supply Chain Management
10-month program with Saturday classes completed only at MMC.
Master of Science in Marketing*
10-month program that can be completed at MMC or Brickell.
Ranked #6 in the U.S. and #20 in the world by QS Business in Master's Rankings (2019).

PhD 
Doctoral students can earn their Doctor of Philosophy in Business Administration at MMC with a concentration in one of the following areas:

 Accounting
 Finance
 Management Information Systems
 Management and International Business
 Marketing

DBA 
FIU's Chapman Graduate School offers a Doctorate of Business Administration that can be completed at FIU's Downtown Brickell campus in 3-years.The DBA program focuses on advanced business theory, analytics, and finely-honed research and quantitative skills. The DBA represents the highest level of academic achievement in business education and will prepare graduates with the advanced knowledge necessary to manage complex organizational environments and solve real-world problems via the conduct of applied research in all areas of business. The founding Program Director is Dr. George M. Marakas. 
Current Cohorts: 
 Class of 2021
 Class of 2022
 Class of 2023
 Class of 2024

Certificate Programs 
Certificate programs consist of 5 courses and offered either fully online, hybrid, or face-to-face on weekends or evenings.

 Advanced Business Analytics
 Business Analytics
 Health Informatics
 Healthcare Management

Business Career Management 
The college houses its own career management services department, providing self-assessment tools, career advising, resume referral, on-campus interviews for internships and permanent employment opportunities. These services are offered to all fully admitted business students (graduate and undergraduate) as well as FIU Business alumni.

Rankings

The College also consistently receives high marks for its undergraduate and graduate programs, as well as faculty research productivity, by influential rankings organizations worldwide.

References

External links 
 
 Florida International University
 College of Business Career Management Services

Business schools in Florida
Florida International University
Educational institutions established in 1965
1965 establishments in Florida